Tanah Abang is a district of Central Jakarta, Indonesia. The district hosts the biggest textile market in Southeast Asia, Tanah Abang Market. It hosts Bung Karno Stadium, in Kelurahan Gelora, and the western half of the largely skyscraper-dominated Sudirman Central Business District.

Namesakes
It is also the name of two historic roads in Kelurahan South Petojo, Gambir District. One of these roads, Tanah Abang 1, hosts the old Dutch Cemetery, now partly a museum Museum Taman Prasasti burial place of Olivia Mariamne Devenish, Eurasian wife of Stamford Raffles.

The city's important Textile Museum is, contrary to as is colloquially stated, in West Jakarta (Kelurahan Kota Bambu Selatan, Palmerah District) just over the western border.

Tanah Abang market

Tanah Abang market is in the Kelurahan Kebon Kacang thus next to Tanah Abang station, on the western edge. The market has been known to exist since 1735. The market is the main forum for textile trade orders in Indonesia and the biggest in Southeast Asia, with much of its business conducted by sample, enabling side-by-side comparison of competitors in quality, design and innovation in all types of textile applications and fashion. Major manufacturers and smaller, niche ones compete for market space. Before 2003, the market was divided into three parts. Part of the market was ravaged by fire in February 2003, but soon rebuilt. Extensions and dominant parts Blok A and Blok B, were added in 2005 and 2010. Blok A is the largest, covering 160,000 square meters, having almost 8,000 kiosks and is visited by about 80,000 buyers on busy days with daily transactions averaging about Rp 500 billion ($43 million). It is well-known among traders from Africa, Australasia and much of Asia.

Traffic congestion
In November 2017, Governor Anies Baswedan claimed that congestion in the Tanah Abang district was caused by pedestrians, instead of due to the street vendors conducting business on the area's sidewalks and roads. The city administration followed through by closing a 400-meter road stretch for traffic (except for Transjakarta buses) in order to accommodate the street vendors, against criticism from pedestrians, public transport drivers and regular vendors. Although some observers noted that the move might be a violation of national regulations, the street vendors and some city officials praised the move. On 7 December 2018, a skybridge was opened above the road to accommodate the street vendors.

Kelurahan (Administrative Villages)
The district is divided into seven Kelurahan (administrative villages) and their area codes are given:

List of important places

 Gelora Bung Karno Stadium
 Hotel Grand Indonesia (western extension)
 Jakarta Convention Center
 Karet Bivak Cemetery
 Petamburan Cemetery
 Senayan City
 Tanah Abang market
 Grid Network
 Wisma 46
 TVRI Tower

Notes and references

Footnotes

Citations

Districts of Jakarta
Articles containing video clips
Central Jakarta